Compact fusion can refer to:

 Lockheed Martin Compact Fusion Reactor
 ARC fusion reactor